Ricardo Alonso was a soccer player who began as a forward before moving to defender later in his career.  Alonso spent six seasons in the North American Soccer League, four in Major Indoor Soccer League, at least three in the American Indoor Soccer Association, one in the American Soccer League and two in the American Professional Soccer League. He was born in Argentina.

Outdoor

NASL
Alonso signed with the Minnesota Kicks of the North American Soccer League in 1979 and spent three seasons with the team.  He then moved to the Jacksonville Tea Men for the 1982 season.  That year, he scored twenty-one goals in thirty games, earning first team All Star recognition.  In 1983, he signed with the Chicago Sting when the Tea Men left the NASL.  He played one full season with the Sting, earning 1983 second team All Star recognition, but was traded, along with Charlie Fajkus, to the Golden Bay Earthquakes in exchange for Hayden Knight and Manny Rojas on July 10, 1984.  Alonso finished the 1984 season with the Earthquakes, but the NASL folded at the end of the season and the Earthquakes moved to the semi-professional Western Soccer Alliance.

ASL/APSL
Following the collapse of the NASL following the 1984 season, Alonso spent several seasons playing indoor soccer.  He returned to the outdoor game in 1989 with the Fort Lauderdale Strikers of the American Soccer League.  That year he led the league in scoring with ten goals and seven assists.  He was also named a first team All Star.  In 1990, the ASL merged with the Western Soccer League to form the American Professional Soccer League.  Alonso remained with the Strikers, now in the APSL.  In 1991, he then moved to the Miami Freedom for the 1991 season before retiring.

Indoor soccer

NASL
Alonso played the 1983-1984 NASL indoor season with the Chicago Sting.

MISL
The year before that, the Chicago Sting entered the 1982-1983 Major Indoor Soccer League season.  With the collapse of the NASL in 1984, Alonso became a dedicated indoor player.  He signed with the Minnesota Strikers for the 1984-1985 season.  When he was released by the Strikers, he returned to the Sting, which was now competing in MISL.  On October 24, 1985, he signed a one-year contract with the Sting after a month-long trial.  On April 29, 1986, he signed another one-year contract with the Chicago Sting of MISL.  That year, he moved to defender.

AISA
The Sting released Alonso after a disappointing 1986-1987 season and he signed with the Jacksonville Generals of the American Indoor Soccer Association for the 1987-1988 season.  He then moved to the Memphis Storm for the 1988-1989 season, however, he was traded to the Fort Wayne Flames during the season.  Alonso then spent the 1989-1990 season with the Memphis Rogues.

References

External links
 NASL stats

1957 births
Living people
American Indoor Soccer Association players
American Professional Soccer League players
American Soccer League (1988–89) players
Argentine expatriate footballers
Argentine expatriate sportspeople in the United States 
Argentine footballers
Chicago Sting (MISL) players
Chicago Sting (NASL) players
Expatriate soccer players in the United States
Association football defenders
Association football forwards
Fort Lauderdale Strikers (1988–1994) players
Fort Wayne Flames players
San Jose Earthquakes (1974–1988) players
Tulsa Tornados players
Jacksonville Generals players
Jacksonville Tea Men players
Major Indoor Soccer League (1978–1992) players
Memphis Rogues players
Memphis Storm players
Miami Freedom players
Minnesota Kicks players
Minnesota Strikers (MISL) players
North American Soccer League (1968–1984) indoor players
North American Soccer League (1968–1984) players
United Soccer League (1984–85) players
Western Soccer Alliance players